William Holland (1809 – September 27, 1883) was a 19th-century British  maker of stained glass and other decorative pieces. His work is represented in churches and stately homes across southern England, Wales, and Ireland. Holland of Warwick windows  can be identified by his mark "Guil Holland Vaivic. Puix " written on a scroll in Latin in the lower right hand corner.
Holland's stained glass reflects the influence of the Cambridge Camden Society and the Gothic Revival work of Thomas Willement.  Willement revived in the early 19th century, the method used at York Minster to build the Great East Window in 1400 wherein coloured pieces are leaded and the lead then becomes part of the design, appearing as black lines in the window.

Studio and business
Holland founded his firm in Warwick at 3 Priory Rd at the intersection with St John's Road, as  "Holland , William and Son, St John's , Warwick . Designers and Producers. Stained glass of the twelfth century representing scriptural events." Other 19th century sources quote his work as Elizabethan style.  Again as  a "stained glass and decorative painting establishment, where every description of design for monumental and baronial windows, enamelled and encaustic painting, gilding, imitations of wood" was executed. At his studio, Holland also trained family members and other well known makers of stained glass, such as Clement Heaton In 1855 Heaton joined James Butler to start his own company in London. The original buildings still stand, a white office on a corner is still attached to a long brick building which was Holland's workshop.

Studio in later years
William's  sons also became experts in stained glass, and a nephew, Frank Holt (1843–1928), joined the firm after which it was known as Holland & Holt and continued on as Holt of Warwick into the early years of the twentieth century.

Representation at Great Exhibition
William Holland's  stained glass was exhibited at the Great Exhibition of 1851 which was held in Hyde Park, London, from 1 May to 15 October, and is found in the Official Catalogue .
The catalogue lists exhibitors and also a  description of various methods used to produce stained glass windows. Glass is found in Section III, Class 24.

Holland is listed in entry 63 in the catalogue as working in various styles:

the twelfth century style : illustrating scriptural events,
the decorative style as in Wellesbourne church
stained glass of the fifteenth century; perpendicular style for Shuckburgh Church
stained glass in the Elizabethan style : emblazoned arms of the Queen of England from the present day up to the present period.

He was one of 25  makers of stained glass listed.

Stained Glass was exhibited lining the eastern walls of the  Central North gallery of the Crystal Palace. Around 1845 there was a revival of interest in all types of worked glass, reflected  in the choice of  panes of sheet or window glass 49 inches long to cover the exhibition halls.  "It has been a popular notion that this  art was lost to us ; such is not the case, it has indeed been dormant, but never extinct. The fine works exhibited  this year (1851) - the production of living artists- announce its revival."  This was the first time that stained glass was exhibited in an extraordinary setting that emphasized its artistry in addition to religious themes.
Displays were set up to explain the process of glass making. A batch of flint glass was made from one part alkali, two parts lead, and three  parts sand with the best quality sand  found at Alum Bay, Isle of Wight and Aylesbury, Buckinghamshire . "The materials are mixed and then melted in a crucible made of fire clay, a substance that can withstand intense, prolonged heat. Melting takes 60 hours. At 12 hours the glass is honeycombed and very white and opaque and a few hours later  is transparent with thousands of air bubbles, which eventually disappear along with the light purple tint: that is oxygen given off by  the oxide of manganese. Tools are then used to manipulate the glass."
Flashed (two layers of colour) and stained glass are coloured on the surface only and through a process of embossing the white surface beneath is revealed.  This was the process most likely used by Holland  to illustrate his windows.

Stained glass in the nineteenth century
During the English Civil War in the 17th century Oliver Cromwell, a zealous Puritan, fought King Charles I and as part of this campaign, rampaged against the traditional Loyalist church and its ornate trappings.  His troops broke down the heavy doors of parish churches  near and far, and rode on horseback through their interiors, destroying  with their swords anything decorative. Priceless and ancient stained glass windows were shattered and the churches were laid bare to the elements through empty window frames.
In the Nineteenth century the Anglican church became interested in what had been lost: there were a few examples of medieval and Elizabethan windows that had survived this earlier devastation. William Holland's stained glass windows strongly reflect his interest in this period as he described his work to be "Stained glass of the twelfth century representing scriptural events." Religious revivals also influenced architecture and were the motivating factor in rebuilding churches. During a flowering period of reconstruction, older  windows with plain glass and leading were replaced.  See also  British and Irish stained glass (1811–1918) and the Cambridge Camden Society.

Examples of Holland Studio stained glass windows
 Sts Thomas Minster Church Newport IOW (A Minster church)
 All Saints Church Wokingham
 St James, Twycross, Leicestershire
 St Peter's Church, Diocese of Coventry
 Chetwode, St Mary & St Nicholas
 St Mary & All Saints, Haselor, Warwickshire 
 St. Peter's Church, Barford, Warwickshire 
 St Margaret's Church Whitnash, Warwickshire 
 St Peter's Church, Wellesbourne, Warwickshire
 St Collen’s Church, Llangollen, Denbighshire, Wales
 Church of St Peter ad Vincula, Pennal, Gwynedd, Wales (Holland and Holt)
 Christ Church, Taney Dundrum, Ireland.
 Christ Church, Bray, Ireland
 Brownsover Hall, Rugby,   Warwickshire
 St Michael's Church, Budbrooke, Warwickshire 
 St Michael's Church, Stockton, Warwickshire
 Nativity of Mary Church, Studley, Warwickshire
 SS Peter & Paul Church, Butlers Marston, Warwickshire 
 All Saints Church, Royal Leamington Spa, Warwickshire 
 Library/Former Chapel, Princethorpe College, Warwickshire 
 St Andrew's Church, North Kilworth, Leicestershire 
 Collegiate Church of St Mary, Warwick, south west window of chancel

Church of Ireland
Christ Church, Taney Dundrum  incorporates a set of windows signed  " Holland, Son & Holt, Glass Painters, Decorators, &c., Warwick, England, 1872."and "Studio William Holland; Warwick ".

In the EAST Sanctuary  a very large stained glass window is described as "Five lancets each measuring 3760mm x 560mm; rose of one 6-foil and ten quatrefoils; two large mouchettes and several small lights."

Iconography:
King Solomon Building the Temple

Moses in the Bullrushes

Moses and the Brazen Serpent

Elijah Ascending to Heaven

Abraham Sacrificing Isaac

King Solomon in the Temple

Moses and the Tables of the Law

The SOUTH Sanctuary displays "One lancet measuring 2840mm x 560mm. "

Iconography:Visiting the Prisoner

In the NORTH; EAST chancel are "Two lancets, each measuring 2950mm x 560mm, one quatrefoil and two mouchettes. "

Iconography:Taking in the Stranger- on left

Clothing the Naked- on right

In the NORTH; WEST chancel are "Two lancets each measuring 2950x560 mm, one quatrefoil and two small mouchettes. "

Iconography:Feeding the Hungry- on left

Giving Drink to the Thirsty- on right

Notes

References
 “Stylistic Eclecticism in Nineteenth-Century Stained Glass.” Windows for the World: Nineteenth-Century Stained Glass and the International Exhibitions, 1851–1900, by Jasmine Allen, 1st ed., Manchester University Press, Manchester, 2018, pp. 83–126. JSTOR

 Victoria and Albert Museum. Stained glass: The Gothic Revival and Beyond.

Little, Joyce, Stained Glass Marks and Monograms (London: National Association of Decorative and Fine Art Societies, 2002), p. 67.

Warwickshire County Council: Certified copy of an entry of death for William Holand of the Stained Glass Works in Co. St. Johns, Warwick. Death: 27 September 1883

Victoria and Albert Museum: Stained and painted glass 1770–1870 

British stained glass artists and manufacturers
People from Warwick
1883 deaths
1809 births